Sujith Unnikrishnan (born 19 August 1983), known by his stage name Sunny Wayne is an Indian actor who predominantly works in Malayalam cinema. He made his acting debut in Second Show (2012).

Personal life 

Wayne was born to Unnikrishnan and Soumini in Wayanad, on 19 August 1983. His original name is Sujith. He is an alumnus of Calicut University Institute of Engineering and Technology at Tenhipalam in Malappuram district, Kerala. He married his longtime girlfriend Renjini at Guruvayoor Temple on 10 April 2019.

Career 

Sunny Wayne's first work was Second Show which was released in 2012. Indiaglitz.com praised Wayne's portrayal of Kurudi. After that he did a cameo appearance in Vineeth Sreenivasan's musical-romance film Thattathin Marayathu. In 2013, Wayne played a supporting character in Rajeev Ravi's Annayum Rasoolum. He portrayed Rasool's friend Ashley and story unveils through his narration. The Sify.com reviewer stated "Sunny Wayne underlines why he is regarded as one of the most talented actors to have happened to Malayalam cinema during recent times and his narration sets the mood very well." Wayne went on to play the cosmetic surgeon Roshan in Nee Ko Njaa Cha directed by debutant Gireesh. The Times of India wrote "Sunny Wayne throws himself into the character of Dr Roshan, a seasoned playboy with calm elegance. He looks sleek, stylish and sometimes genuinely funny." He appeared in Neelakasham Pachakadal Chuvanna Bhoomi directed by Sameer Thahir. He also portrayed the character Satan Xavier in the film Aadu directed by Midhun Manuel Thomas. The next year, his character Poombata Gireesh in the film Annmariya Kalippilannu(2016) was well acclaimed by the audience. He portrayed the role of Vijay fan in the Movie Pokkiri Simon(2017). Wayne made his Tamil debut with Gypsy.

In 2018, he launched a production company named Sunny Wayne Productions which produced a theatre drama titled Moment Just Before Death. It produced 2 films: Nivin Pauly movie Padavettu and Appan movie starring Sunny Wayne.

Filmography

As actor

As producer

As dubbing artist 
 Ezra – Voice for Sujith Shanker

References

External links 

 

 Sunny Wayne on Malayalam Movies

People from Wayanad district
Living people
Male actors from Kerala
1983 births
21st-century Indian male actors
Male actors in Malayalam cinema
Indian male film actors
Indian male voice actors